Ofra Harnoy  (born January 31, 1965) is an Israeli-Canadian cellist. She is a Member of the Order of Canada. By joining the international artists roster of RCA Victor Red Seal, Harnoy became the first Canadian classical instrumental soloist since Glenn Gould to gain an exclusive worldwide contract with a major record label. She is a five-time Juno Award winner.

Life
Harnoy was born in Hadera, Israel. She moved with her family to Toronto in 1971. When she was six, she began cello lessons with her father, Jacob Harnoy. Her teachers included Vladimir Orloff, William Pleeth, Pierre Fournier, Jacqueline du Pré, and Mstislav Rostropovich.

Harnoy made her professional debut as a soloist with an orchestra at age 10. Her solo-orchestral and recital debuts at Carnegie Hall in 1982 brought her public and critical acclaim.

Harnoy performed and recorded the world premiere of the Offenbach cello concerto in 1983 and the North American premiere of the Bliss cello concerto in 1984. She also made the world premiere recordings of several Vivaldi concertos. In 1987, she joined the roster of RCA Victor Red Seal and recorded several best selling albums.

Harnoy has played in many genres of music. She has played with artists such as Plácido Domingo, Sting, Igor Oistrakh, Loreena McKennitt, and Jesse Cook.

In 2019, Harnoy released her latest album, Back to Bach on the Canadian Classical label Analekta. 

She is married to the trumpeter, producer, and composer Mike Herriott.

Awards
 Winner of a number of major Canadian competitions
 1982 Concert Artists Guild award in New York
 1983 Young Musician of the Year by Musical America Magazine
 1986-97 Juno for Best Classical Album (Schubert Quintet in C)
 1988 Juno for Best Classical Album (Schubert Arpeggione Sonata)
 1990 Juno for Instrumental Artist of the Year
 1992 Juno for Instrumental Artist of the Year
 1993 Juno for Instrumental Artist of the Year
 1990, 1992, 1993 Juno Awards for Instrumental Artist of the Year
 1988 Grand Prix du Disque
 Several “Best of the Year” and “Critic’s Choice” awards for her recordings from Gramophone magazine, High Fidelity magazine and Ovation magazine.
 In 1995 she was made a Member of the Order of Canada
 Israeli classical cellists

Discography
 Back to Bach (2019)
 Vivaldi: Complete Cello Concertos (2005)
Disc 1 with the Toronto Chamber Orchestra with Paul Robinson, conductor (also issued separately 2009 as Vivaldi:  Cello Concertos, vol. 1
Concerto for Cello in D minor, RV 405
Concerto for Cello in C minor, RV 401
Concerto for Cello in B-flat, RV 423
Concerto for Cello in C, RV 399
Concerto for Cello and Bassoon in E minor, RV 409, with James McKay, bassoon
Concerto Movement for Cello in D minor, RV 538
Disc 2 with the Toronto Chamber Orchestra with Paul Robinson, conductor (also issued separately 2010 as Vivaldi:  Cello Concertos, vol. 2
Concerto for Cello in D, RV 403
Concerto for Cello in B minor, RV 424
Concerto for Cello in A minor, RV 422
Concerto for Cello in C minor, RV 402
Concerto for Cello in F, RV 412
Concerto for Cello in G, RV 414
Concerto for Cello in D minor, RV 406
Disc 3 with the Toronto Chamber Orchestra with Paul Robinson, conductor (also issued separately 2009 as Vivaldi:  Cello Concertos, vol. 3
Concerto for Cello in F, RV 411
Concerto for Cello in D, RV 404
Concerto for Cello in A minor, RV 420
Concerto for Cello in D minor, RV 407
Concerto for Cello in G minor, RV 417
Concerto for Violin, Cello, and Orchestra in F, "Il Proteo o sia Il mondo al rovescio," RV 544, with Igor Oistrakh, violin
Disc 4 with the Toronto Chamber Orchestra with Richard Stamp (RV 418, RV 408, RV 416, RV 419, and RV 413) or Paul Robinson (RV 547), conductor (also issued separately 1997 as Vivaldi:  Cello Concertos, vol. 4
Concerto for Cello in A minor, RV 418
Concerto for Cello in E-flat, RV 408
Concerto for Cello in G minor, RV 416
Concerto for Cello in A minor, RV 419 (world premiere recording)
Concerto for Cello in G, RV 413
Concerto for Violin, Cello, and Orchestra in B-flat, RV 547, with Igor Oistrakh, violin
 Tchaikovsky: Rococo Variations, Music for Cello & Orchestra (1992)
 Trilogy – cello concertos by I Solisti Veneti, Claudio Scimone and Ofra Harnoy (1993)
 Imagine (1996)
 Cello Recital (1980) (Masters Of The Bow)

References

External links
 Official website

Canadian classical cellists
Jewish classical musicians
Jewish Canadian musicians
Jewish Israeli musicians
Members of the Order of Canada
Musicians from Toronto
Juno Award for Instrumental Album of the Year winners
Israeli emigrants to Canada
People from Hadera
1965 births
Living people
Canadian women classical cellists
Juno Award for Classical Album of the Year – Solo or Chamber Ensemble winners